Marble Range Provincial Park is a provincial park in British Columbia, Canada, located west of 100 Mile House and Clinton at the southwest edge of the Cariboo Plateau along the eastern edge of the Fraser Canyon south from Big Bar-Kostering and near Jesmond.

References

See also
Edge Hills Provincial Park
Marble Canyon Provincial Park

Provincial parks of British Columbia
Geography of the Cariboo
Fraser Canyon
Year of establishment missing